The 2004–05 Bucknell Bison men's basketball team represented Bucknell University during the 2004–05 NCAA Division I men's basketball season. The Bison, led by head coach Pat Flannery, played their home games at Sojka Pavilion and were members of the Patriot League. They finished the season 23–10, 10–4 in Patriot League play to finish second in the conference regular season. They won the Patriot League tournament to earn an automatic bid to the 2005 NCAA tournament where they upset No. 3 seed Kansas in the opening round. In the round of 32, the Bison were beaten by No. 6 seed Wisconsin.

Roster

Schedule and results

|-
!colspan=9 style=| Regular season

|-
!colspan=9 style=| Patriot League tournament

|-
!colspan=9 style=| NCAA tournament

,

References

Bucknell Bison men's basketball seasons
Bucknell
Bucknell
Bucknell Bison
Bucknell Bison